Ajaz Yunus Patel (born 21 October 1988) is a New Zealand cricketer born in Mumbai, India who plays for Central Districts in domestic cricket. He emigrated with his family from Mumbai when he was eight years old, and was formerly a left-arm seam bowler. Patel is a slow left-arm orthodox spin bowler. He made his international debut for the New Zealand cricket team in October 2018. The following month, he made his Test debut for New Zealand, taking five wickets in the second innings. In May 2020, New Zealand Cricket awarded him with a central contract, ahead of the 2020–21 season.

In December 2021, in the second Test against India, Patel became the third bowler in Test cricket to take all ten wickets in an innings. Jim Laker and Anil Kumble were the others to do so. However, New Zealand still met with a heavy defeat in the match. This makes Patel the only one of the mentioned three to end up on the losing side after this achievement (England defeated Australia in Laker's Test and India defeated Pakistan in the Kumble one).

Domestic career
Patel made his List A debut on 27 December 2015 in the 2015–16 Ford Trophy. He took the most wickets in the 2015–16 Plunket Shield season, with 43 dismissals. He was also the leading wicket-taker in the following season, with 44 dismissals.

In April 2018, Patel was named the Men's Domestic Player of the Year at the New Zealand Cricket Awards. He finished the 2017–18 Plunket Shield season as the leading wicket-taker, with 48 dismissals in nine matches. In June 2018, he was awarded a contract with Central Districts for the 2018–19 season. In July 2022, Patel was signed by Glamorgan to play in their final four matches of the County Championship in England, he took a total of 14 wickets.

International career
In July 2018, Patel was named in New Zealand's Test squad for their series against Pakistan. In October 2018, he was named in New Zealand's Twenty20 International (T20I) squad, also for their series against Pakistan. He made his T20I debut for New Zealand against Pakistan on 31 October 2018. During the same tour, he was also added to New Zealand's One Day International (ODI) squad, but he did not play in the ODI series. He made his Test debut for New Zealand against Pakistan on 16 November 2018. He took five wickets in the second innings, with New Zealand winning by four runs, and was named the man of the match. In August 2021, Patel was named in New Zealand's ODI squad for their tour of Pakistan.

India 2021: Ten wickets
In November 2021, Patel was named in New Zealand's Test squad for their two-match series in India. The first Test finished in a draw late on day five, with Patel taking 2/90 in the first innings, and 1/60 in the second innings of the match. The second Test started on 3 December 2021, with Patel taking all ten wickets in the first innings of the match, finishing with figures of 10/119 from 47.5 overs. Patel became the third bowler, after Jim Laker in 1956 and Anil Kumble in 1999, to take all ten wickets in an innings of a Test match. In the second innings, Patel took a further four wickets, finishing the match with 14/225, the best bowling figures in a Test match against India.

See also
 List of New Zealand cricketers who have taken five-wicket hauls on Test debut

References

External links
 

1988 births
Living people
New Zealand cricketers
New Zealand Test cricketers
New Zealand Twenty20 International cricketers
Central Districts cricketers
Cricketers from Mumbai
Indian emigrants to New Zealand
New Zealand sportspeople of Indian descent
Cricketers who have taken five wickets on Test debut
Naturalised citizens of New Zealand
Cricketers who have taken ten wickets in an innings